Válicka is a small river in Zala County of western Hungary. Also known as Felső-Válicka, Baki-Valicka, Baki-Válicka, Eszaki-Valicka, Valicka, Valicka-patak, Válicka-patak, Északi-Válicka. It originates in the Southwest of Zala County and merges into the Zala River. It flows by several villages including Bak, Sárhida, Bocfölde, Csatár, Botfa, Csácsbozsok.

References

Valicka River